Karyn Kupcinet (born Roberta Lynn Kupcinet; March 6, 1941 – November 28, 1963) was an American stage, film, and television actress. She was the daughter of Chicago newspaper columnist and television personality Irv Kupcinet, and the sister of television director and producer Jerry Kupcinet.

Kupcinet had a brief acting career during the early 1960s. Six days after the assassination of John F. Kennedy, her body was found at her home in West Hollywood, California. With her death officially ruled an unsolved homicide, and occurring so close to the assassination, her name became one of hundreds added to the multiplicity of theories that emerged after the assassination. 

Kupcinet's father publicly dismissed the theories linking his daughter to the president's death. In 1992, after NBC's Today program briefly referred via a caption to her alleged connection to the assassination, Irv Kupcinet described the broadcast as "an atrocious outrage" and "calumny". Karyn Kupcinet's death remains officially unsolved.

Early life
Karyn Kupcinet was born Roberta Lynn Kupcinet in Chicago, Illinois, to Irv Kupcinet, a sportswriter for the Chicago Daily Times, and his wife, Esther Kupcinet (née Solomon). Her younger brother, Jerry Kupcinet, is a director and producer in television. She acquired the nickname "Cookie" during her childhood. Kupcinet made her acting debut at age 13 in the Chicago production of Anniversary Waltz and went on to attend Pine Manor College for a semester, eventually studying at the Actors Studio in New York City.

Career

Kupcinet's interest in acting was encouraged by her mother, and she was afforded access to producers through the reputation of her father. In 1961, Jerry Lewis offered Kupcinet a role in the film The Ladies Man, where she appeared in a bit part as one of dozens of young ladies in a Hollywood boardinghouse. In 1962, she appeared in the role of Annie Sullivan in a Laguna Beach summer theater production of The Miracle Worker. She also appeared in guest roles on television, including The Donna Reed Show, The Wide Country, G.E. True, Going My Way, The Andy Griffith Show, and Death Valley Days. In addition to guest spots, Kupcinet had a regular role in the prime-time series Mrs. G. Goes to College (retitled The Gertrude Berg Show during its short run).

Kupcinet's last onscreen appearance was on Perry Mason in the role of Penny Ames, in an episode entitled "The Case of the Capering Camera". The episode aired on CBS on January 16, 1964, nearly two months after her death.

Personal life
By 1961, Kupcinet was living in Hollywood and getting positive reviews for her acting. In December 1962 she filmed a guest-star appearance on The Wide Country and had her first meeting with one of the series' stars, Andrew Prine, beginning a relationship with him. However, the relationship was problematic due to Prine's objections to making the relationship exclusive. After Kupcinet underwent an illegal abortion in July 1963, the relationship cooled and Prine began dating other women. In turn, Kupcinet began spying on Prine and his new girlfriend.

The Los Angeles County Sheriff's Department later determined Kupcinet had delivered threatening and profane messages, consisting of words and letters she had cut out of magazines, to Prine and herself. When Prine told her by telephone about anonymous messages that had been Scotch-taped to the door of his Los Angeles house, she said she had received them as well. They met to show the messages to each other; she seemed puzzled. Soon after her death, investigators for the sheriff's department found her fingerprints on the papers and the Scotch tape.

Kupcinet had longstanding issues with weight, which started after she began taking diet pills in high school. The pressure to stay thin intensified after Kupcinet arrived in Hollywood, and she soon began abusing diet pills along with other prescription drugs. A Los Angeles Times interviewer, assigned to help Kupcinet promote The Gertrude Berg Show in March 1962, noted her talking exclusively about food and her weight. Kupcinet had also been arrested for shoplifting.

Death
On November 28, 1963, Kupcinet had dinner with future Lost in Space cast member Mark Goddard and his wife, Marcia Rogers Goddard, at their house on Coldwater Canyon Drive in Beverly Hills. The Goddards expected her to arrive at 6:30 pm, but she showed up in a taxicab an hour late. 

The couple later reported that Kupcinet only toyed with her food during the meal and avoided eating. Marcia told Los Angeles County sheriff's deputies that "her lips seemed numb. Her voice was funny. She moved her head at odd angles." The Goddards also noticed that Kupcinet's pupils were constricted. When Mark confronted Kupcinet about her behavior, she began to cry and put her arm around him. At one point during the meal, she told an unsubstantiated story about a baby that had been abandoned on her doorstep earlier that day. At 8:30 pm, a taxicab arrived to take Kupcinet home, and she promised to telephone the Goddards.

Kupcinet apparently went straight home after the dinner. She was visited by freelance writer Edward Stephen Rubin shortly afterward. The two were then joined by actor Robert Hathaway around 9:30 pm. Rubin and Hathaway told detectives the three of them watched television, including The Danny Kaye Show, and drank coffee until Kupcinet fell asleep next to them on the couch. She later awoke and went to her room. Rubin and Hathaway either turned the television off or simply lowered the volume (three days later it was still playing with a low volume) and made sure the door was locked behind them before departing at about 11:15 pm. Hathaway said that the two men returned to his place and were later joined by Prine, who was also Hathaway's neighbor. The trio watched television and talked until around 3:00 am.

The Goddards went to Kupcinet's apartment on November 30 after she failed to telephone the couple as promised. Mark later stated that he had a "funny feeling" that something was wrong. Upon entering the apartment, the couple found Kupcinet's nude body lying on the couch. Mark initially assumed that she had died from a drug overdose; upon searching the apartment, investigators from the Los Angeles County Sheriff's Department found prescriptions for Desoxyn, Miltown, Amvicel, and other medications. They also found a note written by Kupcinet that reflected in some detail her emotions regarding issues in her life and people she admired.

Coroner Harold Kade concluded that due to the fracture of the hyoid bone in Kupcinet’s throat, she had been strangled. Her death was officially ruled a homicide.

Investigators from the Los Angeles County Sheriff's Department determined that the story Kupcinet had told the Goddards about an abandoned baby on her doorstep, which she had also told Prine by telephone, was false. Neither the sheriff's office nor the Los Angeles Police Department had received a report of a baby found abandoned anywhere in Kupcinet's apartment building on the day before or after the murder.

Theories

Lover's quarrel
Investigators named Andrew Prine as one of their chief suspects. When questioned by law enforcement, he reported talking with Kupcinet twice by phone the day before her murder, claiming he was trying to patch up a lover's quarrel between them. Detectives considered it possible that after Prine learned the anonymous letters had received had been created by Kupcinet, that and their unresolved argument gave him a motive for murder. In addition, both Rubin and Hathaway, the two men who had possibly been the last to see her alive, were friends of Prine. They were also eventually named as suspects.

In 1988, Kupcinet's father published a memoir in which he revealed that he and his wife Essee believed that Prine had nothing to do with their daughter's murder.  He was suspicious of a person, still alive when he wrote his memoir, who had no connection to Prine.

Alleged connection to JFK
Kupcinet's death was first mentioned in connection with the John F. Kennedy assassination in 1967 by researcher Penn Jones Jr. in the self-published book Forgive My Grief II. Jones cited an Associated Press wire service story about an unidentified woman who placed a phone call from the vicinity of Oxnard, California, about fifty miles northwest of Los Angeles, twenty minutes before the assassination occurred in Dallas, Texas, claiming this woman was Kupcinet.

Jones alleged that "Karyn Kupcinet" had attempted to warn someone of the impending assassination after being given this information by her father Irv, who himself had allegedly been given advance notice by Jack Ruby, the Dallas nightclub owner who fatally shot Kennedy's accused assassin, Lee Harvey Oswald. Jones speculated that Irv may have met Ruby in Chicago in the 1940s. Jones speculated Karyn had been murdered by representatives of the Italian-American Mafia as a message to her father to remain silent about why Kennedy and Oswald had been shot.
  
Irv Kupcinet denied that he or his daughter had prior knowledge of the assassination or of Oswald's death. This was supported by Kupcinet's friends, including Prine, actor Earl Holliman, and Holliman's then-girlfriend, all of whom traveled to Palm Springs with Karyn on November 22. Kupcinet reportedly seemed upset about media coverage of the shootings while in Palm Springs. She did not reveal any foreknowledge of the events.

In 2013, the Ventura County Star commemorated the 50th anniversary of the Kennedy assassination with a long article about the unknown woman who had formed the basis of Penn Jones' conspiracy theory. Citing FBI documents that were declassified decades after the assassination, the Star claimed that two telephone operators with General Telephone Company who listened to the unknown woman gave the FBI a description of her voice. FBI agents questioned the two operators several hours after the assassination. Their description of the woman's voice did not match Kupcinet's, especially in regard to her age. The Star added that the two operators believed the woman on the phone was "mentally disturbed".

Regarding Irv Kupcinet's alleged connection to Jack Ruby, the Warren Commission did not find any proof that Irv had interacted with Ruby in Chicago before 1947, when Ruby moved from Chicago to Dallas. The Commission questioned many Chicagoans who had interacted with Ruby. None of them had prior knowledge that he was going to shoot Oswald.

Media attention
In the early 1990s, during the production and subsequent release of Oliver Stone's film JFK, Irv Kupcinet attacked the movie and the conspiracy theories surrounding it. When the film's box-office success led to a wave of media attention about Kennedy conspiracy theories, NBC's Today program broadcast a list of mysterious deaths, including that of Karyn Kupcinet. Irv responded to the Today broadcast in his column in the Chicago Sun-Times of February 9, 1992:

 The NBC Today Show on Friday [February 7] carried a list of people who died violently in 1963 shortly after the death of President John F. Kennedy and may have had some link to the assassination. The first name on the list was Karyn Kupcinet, my daughter. That is an atrocious outrage. She did die violently in a Hollywood murder case still unsolved. That same list was published in a book years ago with no justification or verification.

The book left the impression that some on the list may have been killed to silence them because of knowledge of the assassination. Nothing could be further from the truth in my daughter's case. The list apparently has developed a life of its own and for Today to repeat the calumny is reprehensible. Karyn no longer can suffer pain by such an inexcusable mention, but her parents and her brother Jerry can.

On September 30, 1999, an episode of E! True Hollywood Story, titled "Death of a Dream: Karyn Kupcinet", detailed Kupcinet's life and theories regarding her death.

Legacy

Irv and Essee Kupcinet established a playhouse at Shimer College in honor of their daughter. In 1971, Irv Kupcinet and his wife also founded the Karyn Kupcinet International School for Science, a summer research internships program at the Weizmann Institute of Science.

In 2007, Kupcinet's niece, actress Kari Kupcinet-Kriser, and Washburn University professor Paul Fecteau, began work on a book about Kupcinet's unsolved murder.

Filmography

See also
List of unsolved murders of 20th century

References

Further reading
 Austin, John. Hollywood's Unsolved Mysteries. Shapolsky Publishers. 1990. .
 Kupcinet, Irv and Paul Neimark. Kup: A Man, An Era, A City. Bonus Books. 1988. .

External links

 

1941 births
1963 deaths
1963 murders in the United States
20th-century American actresses
Actresses from Chicago
American film actresses
American stage actresses
American television actresses
Deaths by strangulation in the United States
Deaths from asphyxiation
Female murder victims
People associated with the assassination of John F. Kennedy
People murdered in California
Unsolved murders in the United States